The 2013 RideLondon–Surrey Classic (also known as the 2013 Prudential RideLondon–Surrey Classic for sponsorship reasons) was the inaugural running of the RideLondon–Surrey Classic one-day cycling race. It was held on 4 August 2013 as a 1.1 category event within the 2013 UCI Europe Tour.

The race was won by  rider Arnaud Démare in a sprint finish from a large main group of 96 riders. Sacha Modolo of  finished second, having also finished second on The Mall in the 2011 London-Surrey Cycle Classic.

Pre-race favourite Peter Sagan failed to finish together with Matthew Goss. The highest place Briton was Ben Swift who having been edged out in the final sprint, rolled in tenth, ahead of Gerald Ciolek - winner of the 2013 Milan – San Remo.

Route 

The  route chosen for the 2013 edition of the RideLondon–Surrey Classic was a variation of the course used for the 2012 Summer Olympics. The route featured five categorised climbs and three intermediate sprint points.

Riders started from the Queen Elizabeth Olympic Park close to the Olympic Velodrome before passing close to Canary Wharf and the Tower of London on the way through central London. Leaving London by the A4 the route passed through Richmond Park, Kingston upon Thames and Hampton Court Palace.

In Surrey the route passed through Weybridge and Ripley on the way to the first categorised climb of Newlands Corner near Guildford before heading along the A25 to Abinger Hammer. The route then featured three  laps of a hilly section routed through Holmbury St Mary, Forest Green and Ockley which included the climb of Leith Hill - the highest point in South-East England.

The route back to London travelled through Dorking and included a single ascent of Box Hill before the largely flat run-in via Cobham, Kingston upon Thames, Wimbledon and Putney. The final kilometres followed the Embankment, past the Palace of Westminster, along Whitehall and turned right through Admiralty Arch 400m from the finish on The Mall.

Sprints classification 
There were three Intermediate Sprints that counted towards the sprints classification:

Note that points were not awarded at the finish line.

King of the Mountains classification 
There were five categorised climbs that counted towards the King of the Mountains classification:

Teams 
25 teams were invited to the 2013 RideLondon–Surrey Classic: 8 UCI ProTeams, 6 UCI Pro Continental Teams, 10 UCI Continental Teams along with the British national team.

Each of the 25 teams were due to enter six riders to the race, making up a starting peloton of 150 riders.  and  both entered teams of five riders, and Vegard Breen of  did not start, making a starting field of 147 riders.

The 25 teams that competed in the race were:

Race report 
A breakaway of eight riders formed after 44 km, although their advantage did not increase beyond five minutes. The breakaway contained Ramon Sinkeldam of  who would subsequently amass enough points at the intermediate sprints and on the categorised climbs to win both the Sprints Classification and the King of the Mountains Classification.

With ,  and  controlling the peloton the gap to the breakaway reduced to a little over two minutes after the three laps of the Leith Hill circuit. The peloton briefly splintered on the last categorised climb of Box Hill as David Millar of  set a furious pace which led to the escape of his team mate Jack Bauer together with Yoann Offredo and Simon Yates (Great Britain Cycling Team) - who eventually caught the early breakaway.

With the peloton approaching Yoann Offredo and Zico Waeytens attacked the remnants of the breakaway on the approach to Kingston upon Thames and built a lead of over a minute with 20 km left to race, however on the approach to London (within the final 6 km) they too were caught by the peloton — resulting in the widely expected bunch sprint on The Mall.

David Millar led the peloton through Westminster, but as the teams passed under the flamme rouge with 1 km to go it was  who were the better organised, delivering Arnaud Démare to the line to win by a bike length from Sacha Modolo.

Results

General classification 
Of the 147 starters 131 completed the course within the time limit and 96 riders finished on the same time. The top 10 finishers were:

Sprints classification 
The results of the Sprints Classification were:

King of the Mountains classification 
The results of the King of the Mountains Classification were:

References

External links 
 

2013 UCI Europe Tour
2013 in British sport
2013
2013 in English sport
2013 sports events in London
August 2013 sports events in the United Kingdom